This is a list of Royal Navy aircraft wings.

Naval Aircraft Wings

Aircraft Carrier Groups

 1st Carrier Air Group
 2nd Carrier Air Group
 3rd Carrier Air Group
 6th Carrier Air Group - Never formed
 7th Carrier Air Group
 8th Carrier Air Group
 10th Carrier Air Group
 11th Carrier Air Group
 13th Carrier Air Group
 14th Carrier Air Group
 15th Carrier Air Group
 16th Carrier Air Group
 17th Carrier Air Group
 18th Carrier Air Group - Formed in Canadian Naval Service
 19th Carrier Air Group - Formed in Canadian Naval Service
 20th Carrier Air Group
 21st Carrier Air Group

References

Citations

Bibliography

Air
Aircraft wings
Royal Navy aircraft